Matthew Joseph Jaworski (born October 23, 1967) is a former American football linebacker who played eight games with the Indianapolis Colts during the 1991 season.

Life
Jaworski was born in 1967 in Blasdell, New York and attended Colgate University.

References

Living people
1967 births
American football linebackers
Colgate Raiders football players
Indianapolis Colts players
Players of American football from New York (state)
People from Erie County, New York